Ghosts of Princes in Towers is the only studio album by British band Rich Kids, released in August 1978 by record label EMI. It was produced by Mick Ronson.

Release and reception 

Ghosts of Princes in Towers was released in August 1978. The album featured their hit single "Rich Kids", which reached number 24 in the UK Singles Chart. Two other singles, "Marching Men" and "Ghosts of Princes in Towers", were released. The album itself reached number 51 in the UK Albums Chart.

Reception 

A point of criticism for the album was its production. In its retrospective review, AllMusic wrote that the album "failed to live up to the promise of the single ["Ghosts of Princes in Towers"], in most cases trading punky power-pop in favor of more dirge-like hard rock – muddy sound doesn't help matters either." Trouser Press wrote that "despite abysmal sound, the band's talent emerges, and Ghosts is an extraordinary album of daring experimental rock/pop". Head Heritage described it as "an outstanding album that is head and shoulders above anything The Jam or Buzzcocks had yet released at the time."

Track listing

Personnel
Rich Kids
 Midge Ure – lead (1-3, 5-10, 13, 14) and backing vocals, rhythm guitar, keyboards (2, 10)
 Steve New – lead guitar, keyboards (1), backing vocals
 Glen Matlock – bass, backing and lead (4, 11, 12) vocals
 Rusty Egan – drums
with:
Mick Ronson – keyboards (1, 3, 6, 10)
Ian McLagan – piano on "Cheap Emotions"
Technical
Rocking Russian - cover design
Peter Lavery - cover photography

References

External links 

 

1978 debut albums
Albums produced by Mick Ronson
EMI Records albums